The 1969 season was the 64th season of competitive football in Norway.

Men's football

League season

Promotion and relegation

1. divisjon

2. divisjon

Group A

Group B

3. divisjon

Cup competitions

Norwegian Cup

Final

Replay

Northern Norwegian Cup

Final

UEFA competitions

European Cup

First round

|}

European Cup Winners' Cup

First round

|}

Inter-Cities Fairs Cup

First round

|}

Second round

National team

References

 
Seasons in Norwegian football